The Birthday Concert is a live album by Jaco Pastorius released posthumously in 1995. It was recorded in Florida in 1981 to celebrate Pastorius' 30th birthday. Guests included his friends, such as Michael Brecker and the Peter Graves Orchestra.

Track listing
All tracks composed by Jaco Pastorius; except where indicated
 "Soul Intro/The Chicken" (Pastorius/Alfred Ellis) – 08:01
 "Continuum" – 02:34
 "Invitation" (Bronisław Kaper) – 17:42
 "Three Views of a Secret" – 05:56
 "Liberty City" – 08:12
 "Punk Jazz" – 04:35
 "Happy Birthday" (Mildred J. Hill, Patty Hill; arranged and adapted by Larry Warrilow) – 01:48
 "Reza" – 10:36
 "Domingo" – 05:39
 "Band Intros" – 02:38
 "Amerika" (Traditional; arranged and adapted by Jaco Pastorius) – 01:43

Personnel
 Jaco Pastorius – bass
 Brett Murphy – trumpet
 Brian O'Flaherty – trumpet
 Kenneth Faulk – trumpet
 Melton Mustafa – trumpet
 Mike Katz – trombone
 Russ Freeland – trombone
 Peter Graves – bass trombone
 Dave Bargeron – trombone, tuba
 Jerry Peel – French horn
 Peter Gordon – French horn
 Bob Mintzer – bass clarinet, soprano saxophone, tenor saxophone
 Michael Brecker – tenor saxophone
 Randy Emerick – baritone saxophone
 Dan Bonsanti – saxophone, woodwind
 Gary Lindsay – saxophone, woodwind
 Peter Erskine – drums, liner notes
 Othello Molineaux – steel drums
 Don Alias – congas
 Bobby Thomas Jr. - congas
 Oscar Salas – percussion

See also
Jaco Pastorius discography

References

Jaco Pastorius albums
1995 live albums
Warner Records live albums